Valle Aurelia is an underground station on Line A of the Rome Metro, situated between Via Angelo Emo and Via Baldo degli Ubaldi. The station was inaugurated in 1999.

The station is situated underneath the mainline station of the same name, so this station is an interchange with the regional railway FR3.

Services
This station has:
 126 Park and Ride places.
 Access for the disabled
 Elevators
 Escalators

Located nearby
Parco di Monte Ciocci
St. George's British International School - City Centre Junior School campus

External links

 Valle Aurelia station on the Rome public transport site (in Italian)
 Parco di Monte Ciocci (in Italian).

Rome Metro Line A stations
Railway stations opened in 1999
1999 establishments in Italy
Rome Q. XIII Aurelio
Rome Q. XIV Trionfale
Railway stations in Italy opened in the 20th century

ja:ヴァッレ・アウレーリア駅